François-Marie, comte de Broglie and comte de Revel  (1 November 16112 July 1656) was a prominent soldier and commander in the Thirty Years' War.  Born in Piedmont, he was originally known as Francesco-Maria di Broglia, conte di Revel before becoming naturalized in France after 1643.

Broglie founded one of the enduring families of the French aristocracy. His son Victor-Maurice became a marshal of France, and his grandson, François-Marie (also a marshal of France) became the first duc de Broglie.

References

Francois-Marie
Francois-Marie
1611 births
1656 deaths
French military personnel of the Thirty Years' War